The Cârlibaba is a left tributary of the river Bistrița in Romania. It discharges into the Bistrița in the village Cârlibaba.

References

Rivers of Romania
Rivers of Suceava County